A Fazenda 9, known as A Fazenda: Nova Chance (English: The Farm: New Chance) is the ninth season of the Brazilian reality television series A Fazenda, which premiered on Tuesday, September 12, 2017, at 10:30 p.m. on RecordTV.

This season features a cast of sixteen farmers, who are all former contestants from A Fazenda, Power Couple Brasil, A Casa and Aprendiz Celebridades (all from RecordTV), Big Brother Brasil (Globo) and MasterChef (Band) for a new chance to win the grand prize.

It marks the debut of a brand new Farm location, who moved from Itu to Itapecerica da Serra. Roberto Justus returned as host. The grand prize for the winner is R$1.5 million without tax allowances, with a brand new car offered to the runner-up.

Contestants
Below is biographical information according to the RecordTV official site, plus footnoted additions.(ages stated are correct at the start of the contest)

Future Appearances

In 2018, Aritana Maroni appeared with her husband Paulo Rogerio in Power Couple Brasil 3, they finished as runner-up from the competition.

In 2019, Nicole Bahls appeared with her husband Marcelo Bimbi in Power Couple Brasil 4, they originally finished in 8th place, however they comeback to the game and finished as winners from the competition.

In 2021, Dinei appeared in Ilha Record, he originally finished in 13th place, however he comeback to the game and finished in 5th place in the competition.

In 2022, Dinei, with his wife Erika Dias, and Nahim, with his wife Andreia Andrade, appeared in Power Couple Brasil 6. Dinei & Erika finished in 12th place, while Nahim & Andreia finished in 11th place.

In 2022, Matheus Lisboa appeared on De Férias com o Ex Caribe: Salseiro VIP as a ex.

The game

Key Power
Since the fifth season, contestants compete to win the Key Power. The Key Power entitles the holder to open the container which may unleash good or bad consequences on the nomination process. Unlike other seasons, this season the powers are already subdivided in three envelopesː golden, silver and red.

The Key Power winner holds the golden envelope (which will always brings a good consequence) and delegates which contestantes holds the silver and red (defined by the public through of R7.com among three options) envelopes. The Key holder's choice is marked in bold.

Results

Voting history

Ratings and reception

Brazilian ratings
All numbers are in points and provided by IBOPE.

References

External links
 Official Site 

2017 Brazilian television seasons
A Fazenda